Diastasis recti,  or rectus abdominis diastasis, is defined as a gap of about 2.7 cm or greater between the two sides of the rectus abdominis muscle. The distance between the right and left rectus abdominis muscles is created by the stretching of the linea alba, a connective collagen sheath created by the aponeurosis insertions of the transverse abdominis, internal oblique, and external oblique. This condition has no associated morbidity or mortality.

Diastasis of the rectus abdominis muscle most frequently occurs in newborns and pregnant women; however, it may occur in any adult woman or man. In the newborn, the rectus abdominis is not fully developed and may not be sealed together at midline. Diastasis recti is more common in premature newborns. In pregnant or postpartum women, the condition is caused by the stretching of the rectus abdominis by the growing uterus. It is more common in multiparous women (women who have had multiple pregnancies) owing to repeated episodes of stretching. When the defect occurs during pregnancy, the uterus can sometimes be seen bulging through the abdominal wall beneath the skin. Non-pregnant women are more susceptible to develop diastasis recti when over the age of 35 or with high birth weight of child, multiple birth pregnancy, or multiple pregnancies. Additional causes can be attributed to excessive abdominal exercises after the first trimester of pregnancy.

Strength training of all the core muscles, including the abdominis recti muscle, may or may not reduce the size of the gap in pregnant or postpartum women. Crunches may increase the diastasis recti separation. All corrective exercises should be in the form of pulling in the abdominal muscles rather than pushing them outwards. In extreme cases diastasis recti is corrected with a cosmetic surgery procedure known as an abdominoplasty by creating a plication, or folding, of the linea alba and suturing it together, which results in a tighter abdominal wall.

Presentation
A diastasis recti may appear as a ridge running down the midline of the abdomen, anywhere from the xiphoid process to the umbilicus. It becomes more prominent with straining and may disappear when the abdominal muscles are relaxed. The medial borders of the right and left halves of the muscle may be palpated during contraction of the rectus abdominis. The condition can be diagnosed by physical exam, and must be differentiated from an epigastric hernia or incisional hernia, if the patient has had abdominal surgery.  Hernias may be ruled out using ultrasound.

In infants, they typically result from a minor defect of the linea alba between the rectus abdominis muscles. This allows tissue from inside the abdomen to herniate anteriorly. On infants, this may manifest as an apparent 'bubble' under the skin of the belly between the umbilicus and xiphisternum (bottom of the breastbone).

Examination is performed with the subject lying on the back, knees bent at 90° with feet flat, head slightly lifted placing chin on chest. With muscles tense, the examiner then places fingers in the ridge that is presented. Measurement of the width of separation is determined by the number of fingertips that can fit within the space between the left and right rectus abdominis muscles. Separation consisting of a width of 2 fingertips (approximately 1 1/2 centimeters) or more is the determining factor for diagnosing diastasis recti.

Diagnosis

 Diastasis recti can be diagnosed by physical examination, which may include measuring the distance between the rectus abdominis muscles at rest and during contraction at several levels along the linea alba.
 Abdominal ultrasonography provides objective evidence for the diagnosis, and also confirms that the bulge is not a hernia.
 An abdominal CT scan is an acceptable alternative to an ultrasound.

Treatment
 During pregnancy - No treatment is necessary for women while they are still pregnant.
 After delivery - Typically the separation of the abdominal muscles will lessen in the mother within the first 8 weeks after childbirth; however, the connective tissue remains stretched for many. The weakening of the musculature may also cause lower back pain, weakened pelvic alignment, and altered posture. For many, Diastasis Recti is a condition which they have to live with for many years later 
 In children - Complications include development of an umbilical or ventral hernia, which is rare and can be corrected with surgery. If an infant with the condition develops vomiting, or redness or pain in the abdominal area, medical attention should be sought.

Strength training
A systematic review of the evidence found that exercise may or may not reduce the size of the gap in pregnant or postpartum women. The authors looked at 8 studies totaling 336 women and concluded: "Due to the low number and quality of included articles, there is insufficient evidence to recommend that exercise may help to prevent or reduce DRAM," or diastasis of the rectus abdominis muscles, also stating that "non-specific exercise may or may not help to prevent or reduce DRAM during the ante- and postnatal periods."

However, a study conducted by the Columbia University Program in Physical Therapy stated: "Ninety percent of non‐exercising pregnant women exhibited DRA while only 12.5% of exercising women had the condition. The mean DRA located 4.5 cm above the umbilicus was 9.6 mm (± 6.6) for the exercise group and 38.9 mm (± 17.8) for the non‐exercise group. The mean DRA located at the umbilicus was 11.4 mm (± 3.82) for the exercise group and 59.5 mm (± 23.6) for the non‐exercise group. The mean DRA located 4.5 cm below the umbilicus was 8.2 mm (± 7.4) for the exercise group and 60.4 (± 29.0) for the non‐exercise group."

Nevertheless, the following exercises are often recommended to help build abdominal strength, which may or may not help reduce the size of diastasis recti:
 Core contraction – In a seated position, place both hands on abdominal muscles. Take small controlled breaths. Slowly contract the abdominal muscles, pulling them straight back towards the spine. Hold the contraction for 30 seconds, while maintaining the controlled breathing. Complete 10 repetitions.
 Seated squeeze - Again in a seated position, place one hand above the belly button, and the other below the belly button. With controlled breaths, with a mid-way starting point, pull the abdominals back toward the spine, hold for 2 seconds and return to the mid-way point. Complete 100 repetitions.
 Head lift – In a lying down position, knees bent at 90° angle, feet flat, slowly lift the head, chin toward your chest, (concentrate on isolation of the abdominals to prevent hip-flexors from being engaged), slowly contract abdominals toward floor, hold for two seconds, lower head to starting position for 2 seconds. Complete 10 repetitions.
 Upright push-up – A stand-up push-up against the wall, with feet together arms-length away from wall, place hands flat against the wall, contract abdominal muscles toward spine, lean body towards wall, with elbows bent downward close to body, pull abdominal muscles in further, with controlled breathing. Release muscles as you push back to starting position. Complete 20 repetitions. 
 Squat against the wall – Also known as a seated squat, stand with back against the wall, feet out in front of body, slowly lower body to a seated position so knees are bent at a 90° angle, contracting abs toward spine as you raise body back to standing position. Optionally, this exercise can also be done using an exercise ball placed against the wall and the lower back. Complete 20 repetitions.
 Squat with squeeze – A variation to the "squat against the wall" is to place a small resistance ball between the knees, and squeeze the ball while lowering the body to the seated position. Complete 20 repetitions.

Incorrect exercises, including crunches, can increase the diastasis recti separation. All corrective exercises should be in the form of pulling in the abdominal muscles rather than pushing them outwards. Consultation of a professional physiotherapist is recommended for correct exercise routines.

Furthermore, in a review of treatment methods for diastasis recti abdominis, besides strengthening exercises there are other options to treat DRA by postural training; education and training for proper lifting mechanisms; manual therapy (which includes soft tissue mobilization); myofascial release; Noble technique (i.e., manual approximation of abdominal muscles during partial sit-up); and abdominal bracing and taping. Other techniques to strengthen abdominal muscles are using Pilates and functional training.

In addition to the above exercises, the Touro College study concluded the "quadruped" position yielded the most effective results. A quadruped position is defined as "a human whose body weight is supported by both arms as well as both legs". In this position, the subject would start with a flat back, then slowly tilt the head down, and round the spine, contracting the abdominal muscles towards the spine, holding this position for 5 seconds, then releasing back to starting position. Complete two sets of 10 repetitions.

Surgery
In extreme cases, diastasis recti is corrected with a cosmetic surgery procedure known as an abdominoplasty by creating a plication or folding of the linea alba and suturing together. This creates a tighter abdominal wall. There are two surgical methods: one through plication of the anterior rectus sheath, which is most commonly used to repair DRAM; and the other through hernia repair, considering suture closure of the hernia sac combined with mesh reinforcement. Two studies showed few post-operative complications.

In adult females, a laparoscopic "Venetian blind" technique can be used for plication of the recti.

References

External links 

Muscular disorders
Health issues in pregnancy